WHDT-LD (channel 3) is a low-power television station in Boston, Massachusetts, United States. It transmits from atop the Prudential Tower. The station is one of three stations operated by WHDT World Television Service (DE), a business unit of Marksteiner AG. The station carries programming from New Tang Dynasty Television.

On January 6, 2004, the station (then known as WHDN-LP) was granted a license to convert to digital operations, making it one of the first digital low-power stations in the United States; others include Günter Marksteiner's WHDT-CD in Miami, Florida (sold to LocusPoint Networks), and WTHC-LD in Atlanta, Georgia. It carried the programming of Stuart, Florida–based WHDT until that station was sold to Scripps Networks on April 4, 2019.

External links 
 RabbitEars TV Query for WHDT-LD

Low-power television stations in the United States
Television channels and stations established in 1988
HDT-LD